James Arthur Madrox, also called the Multiple Man, is a fictional character appearing in American comic books published by Marvel Comics. Created by writer/editor Len Wein, he first appeared in Giant-Size Fantastic Four #4 (February 1975).

A mutant with the ability to create instant duplicates of himself, Madrox was mainly a minor or supporting character until his appearance in the 1987 miniseries Fallen Angels. The character underwent greater development under writer Peter David through his appearance in David's run of the monthly series X-Factor (vol. 1) in the 1990s, and in David's second and ongoing run of the title (vol. 3) in the 2000s.

The character has appeared in multiple television, film and video game adaptations, most notably in the 2006 film X-Men: The Last Stand, in which he was portrayed by Eric Dane.

Publication history

Jamie Madrox first appeared in Giant-Size Fantastic Four #4. Creator Len Wein had originally intended to call him Zerrox, but was overruled for fear of a lawsuit.

In the 1990s, he played a major role in the series X-Factor. Writer Peter David later admitted that he was unhappy that he had to use Madrox in X-Factor, and it was only over the course of writing the series that he became one of his favorite characters. A MadroX miniseries was published in 2004, also written by David. He and the other members of his detective agency later starred in a revamped X-Factor monthly series that was again written by Peter David.

In 2018 he was featured in a second five-part solo series called Multiple Man written by Matthew Rosenberg and drawn by Andy MacDonald.

Fictional character biography

Youth
Jamie Madrox is born to a family living near the Los Alamos research facility in New Mexico; the background radiation may have stimulated his mutation. When Jamie is born, the doctor's slap causes him to multiply into two identical babies. Professor Charles Xavier, a friend of the Madrox family, suggests that they move to Kansas to raise the boy in privacy. Dr. Daniel Madrox, Jamie's father, creates a suit for him to wear which is designed to absorb kinetic energy, the source of the duplication.

Later, Damian Tryp of Singularity Investigations makes his own offer to look after Jamie, claiming that Jamie is not just a normal mutant, but actually a "changeling", a predecessor to mutants who develops its powers at birth. Jamie's parents refuse to give Jamie to Tryp. When Jamie is fifteen years old, his parents are killed by a tornado alleged to have been caused by Tryp, and Jamie begins to run the farm by himself along with his duplicates, or "dupes", until his suit is damaged.

In his first appearance his date of birth was listed as September 7, 1953.

Muir Island
Jamie Madrox goes to New York City for help where he meets Mister Fantastic of the Fantastic Four. He contacts Professor Xavier, who sends the youth to Muir Island with Moira McTaggert, to work in her laboratory and help her with research. He later helps Moira and fellow mutants Havok and Polaris in searching for the escaped mutant Proteus. Proteus hijacks one of Madrox's duplicates as his own body, although this does not harm Madrox. Following the X-Men's battle with Proteus on Muir Island, Madrox is invited to join the X-Men, but he declines.

One of Jamie's renegade duplicates joins Siryn in the search for runaway New Mutants Sunspot and Warlock. After finding the two, Jamie joins the Fallen Angels.

X-Factor
Jamie Madrox is then one of the residents of Muir Island who comes under the mental control of the Shadow King. Following the destruction of Muir Island and the defeat of the Shadow King, he becomes a member of the second incarnation of the X-Factor team, which is assembled by Val Cooper as a U.S. government response team. Here, he develops a reputation as a prankster, forming a friendship with teammate Strong Guy. Also on the team is former New Mutant Wolfsbane who later joins his X-Factor Investigations.

In the first day of the team, one of his duplicates is shot and killed, and Madrox learns for the first time that he cannot absorb a deceased duplicate. This makes him realize for the first time how independent his duplicates actually are. This becomes clearer to him when a duplicate, working for Mister Sinister, decides that it wants to absorb the original, which it does for a short time, until Jamie's dominant personality breaks free and reabsorbs the wayward dupe.

After he is exposed to the Legacy Virus while performing CPR on an infected Genoshan mutate, Jamie is forced to kill the Acolyte Seamus Mellencamp in self-defense by creating a dupe inside the mutant while his hand is in Mellencamp's mouth. The clone later died from the Legacy Virus. Madrox does not often fight in cosmic battles like most of the other X-Men, but he fought doppelgangers during the Infinity War and, being religious, is taken by the cosmic entity Goddess during the Infinity Crusade.

Jamie's health continues to deteriorate due to the Legacy Virus. An attempted cure by Haven leaves him dead, until it is revealed that it was a duplicate who had been infected and died; the real Madrox was alive and suffering from amnesia.

Jamie is the motivation for the Government-sponsored version of X-Factor to break ties with the government and go underground when the team is tricked into thinking Jamie and his duplicates are actually a squad of super-powered terrorists. Eventually, the team discovers this was a manipulation and the group goes rogue, splitting from the government.

He seeks out Strong Guy, ill after Jamie's alleged death. Unfortunately, this makes Strong Guy even weaker, but Jamie's mistake is fixed by the genius of new team leader Forge.

He then serves as majority staff for Banshee's X-Corps. Banshee hires ex-criminals to police other mutants but things get bad when Mystique goes on a murderous rampage and has Mastermind's daughter mind control them. The X-Men manage to defeat the renegade X-Corps members, he transfers to one of Xavier's official "non X-Men" mutant teams in Paris's X-Corporation, fighting Weapon XII in the Channel which results in the death of teammate Darkstar.

Mutant Town
After the fall of the X-Corporation, Jamie Madrox begins working as a private detective in the "Mutant Town" area of New York, along with former X-Factor teammates Wolfsbane and Strong Guy. In the passing time, Madrox has been sending out his duplicates to lead lives of their own. Among these dupes are a Shaolin monk and an Olympic Gymnast. By this point, his powers are developed to such an extent that any dupe who gains sufficient skills can pass its knowledge on to Jamie, giving him a wide variety of training instantly.

The side effect of excessive withdrawal from absorbing the duplicates leads him to gain their new personalities as well, which gives him a form of dissociative identity disorder, in which any new dupes may spontaneously generate any individual personality aspect of Jamie Prime, making them unpredicatible, as they more often than not disobey his orders or manifest as personalities that are too volatile or meek.

It is during this period that he encounters an assassin named Clay who has the same powers as Jamie. Although killed after telling Jamie that the Multiple Man has no idea what he truly is, Clay would come back later.

X-Factor Investigations
Following the elimination of all but a couple of hundred mutants from the face of the Earth in the "House of M" storyline, it is revealed that Jamie Madrox has upgraded his private detective agency to a new building, under the name X-Factor Investigations. He bought the building using money from a Who Wants to Be a Millionaire-type show, using a room full of dupes as lifelines.

Still suffering from uncontrollable duplicate personalities, Jamie sends one to talk a de-powered Rictor out of jumping off a building who instead pushes him off.  The dupe calls himself "The X-Factor" and threatens Madrox that he will come out whenever dupes are made, and Madrox won't be able to tell before being reabsorbed, and Jamie's new team adds Rictor to the group, along with M, and Siryn. Celebrating a victory after discovering he is not a mutant, but a changeling (see opening biography entry), Jamie has sex with Siryn, and an accidentally forgotten duplicate with M. When Jamie discovers and absorbs the duplicate, both women are furious with him.

Later, Layla Miller, without a home after House of M's reality is shattered, reveals to Jamie that one day they will get married, and Wolfsbane will kill them both on their wedding night.

During "Civil War", a duplicate Jamie had created a few years ago eventually becomes agent of S.H.I.E.L.D.; since he is an enforcer of the Superhuman Registration Act, he registered M and Rictor. However, the true Jamie and X-Factor stand opposed to the legislation, going so far as to make a public statement regarding their position, leading Jamie to go in direct opposition to the neutral stance taken by X-Men leader Cyclops upset at for Jamie withholding the truth about M-Day. Jamie also declares that the empty Mutant Town will be a sanctuary for superheroes being pursued by the government.

Agent Madrox recently met "his" end when he was surprised and re-absorbed by the original Madrox during an investigation of a HYDRA cell. Jamie continues the task of hunting down his stray duplicates and reabsorbing them, but he leaves one, John Maddox, who has carved out a life for himself as an Episcopal priest, husband and father, and Jamie decided not to reabsorb him. Siryn also discovers that she is pregnant by Jamie.

"Messiah Complex"
During the 2007 - 2008 "Messiah Complex" storyline, Cyclops sends Jamie Madrox and Layla Miller to go see Forge having built a machine that allows to monitor alternate timelines. Madrox sends two dupes to find information on two timelines that showed "spikes", after the birth of the Mutant baby, due to two different timelines: one in which the newborn becomes the planet's savior and another where it becomes its dominator. Before anyone can react, Layla jumps into the portal along with one of the dupes, and Madrox collapses into a coma.

Layla and one Madrox duplicate arrive eighty years in the negative future to discover that the mutant race has been severely decimated. Mutants are imprisoned in concentration camps overseen by humans. Layla and the dupe are captured and tattooed with an "M" for mutant over their eyes. There, they encounter a youthful Lucas Bishop that would gladly go back in time to kill the mutant baby responsible for the way this timeline has turned out. Layla straps a stolen grenade to the duplicate, killing him and sending his memories of the event back to Jamie so he can tell of Bishop's treachery. When Jamie awakens, he develops an M tattoo because his body takes on scarring from duplicates. Jamie leaves and returns to X-Factor Investigations, disillusioned due to Layla's loss.

The other duplicate later returns as the character Cortex.

Sean
Siryn goes into labor and proposes to Jamie Madrox, who accepts. Siryn gives birth to a boy, named Sean after her own father. Just hours after his birth, however, Sean, much to the horror of Jamie, Theresa and X-Factor, is absorbed into Jamie's body as Jamie holds the boy, completely against Jamie's will. Jamie realizes that the baby must have been fathered by a dupe rather than by him, and that "the offspring of a dupe isn't really anything more than a dupe". Siryn, filled with rage toward Jamie, breaks his finger and tells him to leave.

Jamie goes to see his preacher dupe John Maddox. Jamie realizes that if the child of a dupe is merely an "infant dupe", then John's son should have been absorbed either by John himself, or when Jamie ruffled the boys hair; therefore John's son must not be his. John admits that he already knows his wife had an affair. Jamie reveals that he plans to kill himself over the grief caused by Sean, but is prevented by a holographic projection of an adult Layla Miller who takes him into the future.

Summers Rebellion
Jamie Madrox is transported to the future in the midst of the Summers Rebellion, where mutants rise up against Sentinel and human oppressors, which is led by Ruby Summers, the daughter of Cyclops and Emma Frost, with Cyclops's optic blasts and Emma's organic mineral body, Layla Miller, and a cyborg Cyclops whose predicament is Jamie's fault.

After kissing Layla (now an adult) out of happiness at seeing her, Cyclops wants Jamie to find out why some mutants are winking out of existence. The group visit an aging senile Doctor Doom who says Layla told him in the past that he'd have to instruct Jamie and her on something in the future, and it is now.

In the present, a former mutant named Lenore ask assistance to X-Factor, claiming that someone was trying to kill her. She felt she was being followed, but every time she looked, it was a different person doing it. Her best friend Candy, another former mutant, was found dead of a gunshot wound which the police ruled a suicide. Lenore didn't believe it, because Candy had a pathological fear of guns. Before Candy died, she told Lenore that she thought she was being followed. Later, Lenore's mother showed up at Lenore's apartment and attempted to shoot her, but was foiled by Longshot. Escaping, Lenore's mother took Darwin hostage. At the last minute, she turned the gun on herself, but it backfired due to Longshot's luck powers. At the hospital, Monet St. Croix attempted to read Lenore's mother's mind, but was overpowered and collapsed. When she woke up, she grabbed Longshot's throat and said "Cortex".

While Strong Guy and Rictor were visiting John Maddox in Vermont, Shatterstar busted through the window and tried to stab Rictor, saying only "Cortex". Once freed of Cortex' control, Shatterstar and Rictor shared a passionate kiss. When Cortex tried to bring Longshot under his mental and physical control, he noted that Longshot and Shatterstar were in many ways identical.

Once she calmed down, Monet told the group that her violent outburst was because of psychic feedback that occurred after she had broken through a psychic barrier in Lenore's mother's mind, but that whatever was controlling her had fled. She then manipulated the group into moving Lenore out of her apartment and hiding her in a penthouse suite in an expensive hotel. There she tried to seduce Darwin, but he figured out that she was acting out of character only to try to get Lenore alone, and so resisted. Monet's body turned bright purple and became covered in tint lights and circuitry. She said that she would then have to kill Darwin, even though he wasn't on Cortex's list. This suggests that whatever Monet had become, she was acting somewhat independently of Cortex himself while receiving instructions from him.

When Cortex loses control over Monet, he is attacked and his hood falls back revealing that he is a duplicate of Madrox. Having his identity uncovered Cortex reveals himself as the second duplicate sent to one of the two "remaining" futures for mutantkind during the "Messiah Complex", to search for a cure for the depowering of 98% of the world's mutants following M-Day, then die in some fashion so that his memories would be transferred back to Madrox.

How this duplicate travelled from the alternative future he was sent to Earth-1191 remains a mystery. The only thing known is that under the direction of Anthony Falcone, who in turn was under the guidance of Damian Tryp from Earth-616, this duplicate was turned into a "doomlock", a chronal variance inhibitor which stops the creation of divergent timelines, which required massive cybernetic modification of his body. He was then sent back in time from Earth-1191 to Earth-616 to kill a list of specific individuals, including Multiple Man, for fear how they might affect the future. As Cortex, Madrox's duplicate apparently has the power to mentally control several people at once.

Meanwhile, on Earth-1191, the Multiple Man was tasked by Cyclops with discovering why certain people seemed to be blinking out and then back into existence. Multiple Man theorized that someone might be altering the past to affect the future. Cortex was attempting to kill Lenore to prevent Hecat'e (of the Summers Rebellion) from being born.

2010 - present
During the 2010 "Chaos War" storyline, Multiple Man is among the heroes that Hercules assembles to help combat the forces of Amatsu-Mikaboshi. Because of what happened in the death realms, the Multiple Man dupes that fell in battle return from the dead alongside the other X-Men that died in battle.

In the 2012 "They Keep Killing Madrox" storyline, Jamie Madrox is fatally impaled by a demon named Bloodbath, and finds himself being repeatedly transported to a series of alternate Earths, including one in which Layla Miller was murdered on the night of her marriage to Madrox by Rahne Sinclair's daughter, another in which Captain America has become Deathlok, and another in which Doctor Strange has been killed by the demonic Dormammu. When Madrox returns to his own Earth, the overjoyed Layla Miller passionately confesses feelings to him. The X-Factor team then discover that Deathlok, Rahne's daughter, and Dormammu have been transported to Madrox's home Earth as well. Madrox and Layla later marry in Las Vegas without incident. After the events of the Hell on Earth War, Jamie and Layla retire and decide to live on Madrox's family farm.

During the 2016 "Death of X" storyline Madrox and his dupes fatally succumb to the Terrigen Mist, alerting the X-Men to the danger of the Mist.

In the 2018 miniseries Multiple Man, one of Madrox's dupes is found locked in a bunker on Muir Island, and brought to the X-Men. This dupe is revealed to embody the treacherous aspects of the original Madrox and deliberately locked himself up for several years in order to find a way to become the new Jamie Prime. However, tests reveal that he is also inflicted with the M-Pox. The dupe convinces Beast to create a serum that would allow him to become the new Prime. He also steals a time machine from Bishop and goes into the future, and becomes the emperor of a totalitarian regime that is policed by his own dupes, although he is opposed by a Resistance that is mostly composed of his other dupes who don't approve his ways. The dupes from the Resistance are sent into the timestream to find help from a heroic-time traveling Madrox, who is revealed to be the Emperor from the further in the future who had a change of heart. After the death of the Emperor, all of the dupes die. However, one of the dupes, who was supposed to find Tony Stark, ends up becoming a bartender on a beach. He survives the Emperor's death, as he was in a different time period at the time, and only returns to the present-day after that time period took a turn for the worst, as evident by the "X" tattoo over his right eye. He takes the serum Beast made for him and sets out to find the wife and child of the original Madrox.

During the 2019 "Uncanny X-Men" storyline, Madrox rejoins Cyclops's new team of X-Men. He and a number of his dupes are all killed by Sentinels after acting as a human shield for his teammates.

Powers and abilities
Jamie Madrox has the power to create perfect copies of himself, which he calls "dupes", and all items on his person (clothing, weaponry, etc.) through impact when he absorbs kinetic energy (although this sometimes has happened at will) through an unknown process. Most of the time, this is caused by him snapping his fingers, stomping his foot, being struck, or collisions. Each of the duplicates has exactly the same power as Jamie himself, and has independent thought, though Madrox "Prime" is usually telepathically and empathically linked to the dupes. His powers have, at least once, been shown to affect the actual design of the shirt he was wearing.

Jamie "Prime" can absorb a dupe back into himself at will, which also makes him absorb the memories, knowledge, and skills of the duplicate. The dupe usually appears right beside the body it "springs" from. It has been noted that dupes have trouble creating more dupes themselves if they have not used their powers for a while, while Madrox is able to use his ability whenever he wants without any such issue.

Jamie was formerly unable to control the duplication process, wearing a special shock-absorbent synthetic stretch fabric costume that contained mechanisms that absorbed kinetic energy so that an army of Madroxes would not instantly appear every time he was struck. The original suit was designed by his father, Dr. Daniel Madrox, and later modified by Reed Richards. Jamie currently wears a stylized shirt with only six large green shock-absorbent pads on the front of the torso. Whether this indicates a greater degree of control over when his dupes manifest, an advance in technology or if it is simply an ordinary shirt with the same design is unclear.

During his time with X-Factor, the maximum number of dupes Madrox could create, including duplicates of the dupes themselves, was approximately 50, but the limit has grown far beyond that, as when Hydra tried to manipulate Jamie into becoming one of them. Their plan backfired because he cannot be mind-controlled, which instead resulted in an immense number of Madroxes that drowned the organization's cohorts. Duplicates have independent minds from the original, but are usually willing to merge back because their memories and knowledge are retained. However, there have been exceptions where duplicates have wished for independence completely, even going so far as to have malicious duplicates intending great harm to the Prime during Peter David's original and modern X-Factor runs (which featured Madrox's dupes manifesting as aspects of the Prime Madrox's personality rather than straightforward duplicates).

As a last-ditch effort, Madrox's abilities can be used to deadly effect, which were used in self-defense against Seamus Mellencamp, when Madrox jammed his hand into Mellencamp's mouth and activated his power, creating a duplicate inside Mellencamp and exploding him from the inside out. He has used this method to threaten people before, as well.

Madrox's duplicates can perish without long term physical harm to himself, as demonstrated when the mutant Proteus possessed a duplicate then consumed its life force — leaving only a burnt out husk, as with all victims of Proteus. The possession caused Madrox to collapse in pain, aware of what was happening, but he later recovered. Another Madrox dupe died of the Legacy Virus, but Madrox himself was unaffected, although he would presumably have received the virus if he absorbed the infected dupe.

Madrox also uses merging with his duplicates as a form of healing. Originally, uninjured dupes "shared" the damage when they merged. If an injured Madrox or dupe merged with an uninjured version, the "new" version had an injury half as severe as the original injury. This method may depend upon the severity of the injury, such as when the M-tattooed dupe sent his scarring to the original.

As a consequence of splitting into multiple selves, Jamie has accumulated a vast wealth of knowledge and experience, along with some confusion over which Jamie did what. For example, although he says his duplicates have had active sex lives, he is not sure whether he himself ever has, to the point that he was once uncertain whether he or a dupe had conceived his son Sean with Siryn (with the result that his body absorbed his infant son the first time he held the boy, as his body regarded the baby as another dupe rather than an independent entity).

Specific special skills accumulated through his vast experience include picking locks, some proficiency in Shaolin Kung Fu, handgun training, multiple languages including Russian and Hawaiian, and playing-card throwing. One of his dupes was a S.H.I.E.L.D. agent, giving him all the prerequisite espionage training. Along the way, he or his duplicates participated in an Olympic gymnastics team and apparently became a licensed attorney.

Madrox has generally been considered a mutant. Unlike most mutants, whose mutant powers emerge during adolescence, Madrox exhibited his gifts from the day he was born. In X-Factor, Damian Tryp declares Madrox is not a mutant, but a "killcrop" like him, so named because they were believed to cause bad harvests in olden times.

Reception
 In 2014, Entertainment Weekly ranked Jamie Madrox the Multiple Man 17th in their "Let's rank every X-Man ever" list.
 In 2022, Screen Rant included Multiple Man in their "10 Most Powerful Lawyers In Comics" list.
 In 2022, CBR.com ranked James Madrox 4th in their "10 Most Powerful Lawyers In Marvel Comics" list.

Other versions

Age of Apocalypse
In the 1995–96 Age of Apocalypse crossover storyline, Jamie Madrox is one of the many mutants captured by Sinister and the Dark Beast for experimentation. His powers are overextended beyond their limits, leaving him nearly mindless, and his duplicates become the Madri — a fanatical cult worshipping Apocalypse and serving as his inquisitors and secret police. The original Madrox is reduced to a diapered, drooling lunatic who plays with children's toys such as rattles and building blocks while being kept in seclusion at the Church of the Madri in Quebec. Eventually, Banshee and Quicksilver attempt a rescue; however, in the end, Madrox shuts down all of his duplicates and dies in the resulting psychic backlash. The destruction of the Madri was one of the major blows to Apocalypse's regime that helped the X-Men overthrow the mutant overlord.

Earth X
Jamie Madrox is referenced in the appendix of issue #6 of the 1997 miniseries Earth X: "Multiple Man. Jaime Madrox lives in every city of the earth. He's sort of a street informer who peddles himself on his ability to convey anything going on to anyone – should they pay high enough". Madrox would later appear in the sequel series Universe X in the Beasts special, in which Jamie's hunger for meat during a food shortage causes him to eat one of his own duplicates. This action brings the curse of Wendigo upon Jamie. Interacting with his own mutation, the curse created a pack of Wendigo. This pack follows the combined forces of Wakanda and the X-Men to the Savage Land. In a last stand against the Wendigo, the combined forces of Black Panther, the X-Men, the Ani-Men and the Hulk defeat the Wendigo in a circle of fire. Jaime then reverts to normal and confesses his cannibalism before dying. It is not specified if the Jamie in this book is the original Jamie or a duplicate.

Marvel Zombies
The Multiple Man is one of the zombies that Ashley G. Williams encounters in issue #3 of the 2007 miniseries Marvel Zombies vs. The Army of Darkness. Duplicated already, all the copies try to devour Ash who seemingly destroys them all. It is not shown how exactly Jamie Madrox turned into a zombie.

Ultimate Marvel
The Ultimate Marvel version of Jamie Madrox is from Madison, Wisconsin., and is a member of the Brotherhood of Mutants. He once staged an entire mutant rights protest march. A sample of his stem cells were stolen by the French military to create the Schizoid Man a "mutate" (a Marvel term for genetically modified humans as opposed to those who developed mutant powers naturally) with similar powers. Madrox appeared alongside Mastermind, Blob, and Toad when they gate-crashed the Academy of Tomorrow's Homecoming dance, though this was later shown to be an illusion. In the "Return of The King" arc, Madrox states that he can only produce approximately 27 or 28 dupes before he gets a bad sense of déjà vu. Madrox has appeared in Ultimates (vol. 3) #2, alongside the Brotherhood.

During the "Ultimatum" storyline, Multiple Man creates tens of thousands of dupes used as "soldiers" in Magneto's plot to destroy the world, succeeding in blowing up Parliament and the Academy of Tomorrow, and killing various characters (including Emma Frost, Sunspot, Cannonball, Polaris, Captain Britain and Hank Pym). Wolverine travels to the Savage Land, discovering that the real Multiple Man had fallen under Lorelei's hypnotic powers. Jamie believes himself to be thirteen years old and Lorelei to be his mother. He also believes that the year he lives in is 1994 and the actions being carried out by his dupes are stories he is drawing. Wolverine tries to call the boy to reason by revealing Lorelei's true intentions, but is later forced to apparently kill him, causing all of the dupes to disappear.

Some time later, it was revealed that the "Jamie" Wolverine killed, was actually another duplicate of Jamie, who believed it was the original Madrox. Quicksilver eventually started using Multiple Man's duplicates to produce helmets similar to that of his father.

In other media

Television
 Jaime Madrox / Multiple Man appears in the X-Men: The Animated Series episode "Cold Comfort". This version is a member of X-Factor.
 A young Jamie Madrox appears in X-Men: Evolution, voiced by David Kaye. This version uses the codename Multiple and is a member of the X-Men's junior team, the New Mutants.
 Jaime Madrox / Multiple Man appears in the Wolverine and the X-Men episode "eXcessive Force", voiced by Crispin Freeman. This version is a member of Mister Sinister's Marauders.

Film
 In X2, Jaime Madrox's name appears on a list of names Mystique scrolls through on William Stryker's computer.
 Jaime Madrox appears in X-Men: The Last Stand portrayed by Eric Dane. This version is a criminal reputed to have robbed seven banks simultaneously. Similarly to his Ultimate Marvel incarnation, he is recruited into Magneto's Brotherhood to assist him in stopping a mutant cure.

Video games
 Multiple Man appears in X-Men: The Official Game, voiced by Eric Dane.
 Multiple Man (spelled as Multipleman) appears in X-Men Legends, voiced by Dee Bradley Baker.
 The Madri appear in X-Men Legends II: Rise of Apocalypse. This version is a group of cultists who follow Apocalypse and are unconnected to Jaime Madrox, Mister Sinister, and Dark Beast.
 Multiple Man appears in Marvel: Ultimate Alliance 2, voiced by Wally Wingert. In the Wii, PS2, and PSP versions, some of Madrox's duplicates serve as bosses in the Anti-Registration campaign. In the PS3, PS4, Xbox 360, Xbox One and PC versions, he appears as a boss in the Pro-Registration campaign. Across all versions, he falls under the Fold's nanite-based mind control after escaping Prison 42.
 Multiple Man appears as an ability card in Ultimate Marvel vs. Capcom 3s "Heroes and Heralds" mode.
 Multiple Man appears as a non-playable character in Marvel Heroes, voiced by Rick Pasqualone.

Miscellaneous
James Madrox appears in the novelization for X2 as a student at the Xavier Institute who is in a relationship with Siryn.

Collected editions

References

External links
 Multiple Man at Marvel.com
 Multiple Man at Marvel Wiki
 Multiple Man at Comic Vine
 UncannyXMen.net Spotlight on Multiple Man

Characters created by Len Wein
Comics characters introduced in 1975
Fictional characters from New Mexico
Fictional characters who can duplicate themselves
Fictional characters with dissociative identity disorder
Fictional private investigators
Marvel Comics characters with accelerated healing
Marvel Comics film characters
Marvel Comics male superheroes
Marvel Comics male supervillains
Marvel Comics martial artists
Marvel Comics mutants
Marvel Comics orphans
X-Factor (comics)
X-Men supporting characters